Northern California Public Media (formerly Rural California Broadcasting Corporation) is a non-profit public media outlet based in Rohnert Park, California, United States, that serves the San Francisco Bay Area. The organization owns PBS and independent television stations and NPR member radio stations. Its president and CEO is Nancy Dobbs.

History
Rural California Broadcasting Corporation began broadcasting on KRCB on December 2, 1984, and on KRCB-FM on September 5, 1994. It received non-profit status on January 17, 1981. On September 7, 2017, RCBC announced that it would acquire KCSM-TV for $. Upon acquiring the station on July 31, 2018, RCBC rebranded as Northern California Public Media.

In 2019, the Kincade Fire destroyed KRCB-FM's transmitter tower. To obtain a full-powered signal in the Santa Rosa area, Northern California Public Media acquired KDHT in 2021 and moved KRCB-FM to its 104.9 MHz frequency and transmission facility. The former KRCB-FM became KRCG-FM.

Stations
Northern California Public Broadcasting owns the following noncommercial stations:

 KRCB in Cotati, a PBS member television station
 KPJK in San Mateo, an independent television station
 KRCG-FM in Windsor, an NPR member radio station
 KRCB-FM in Rohnert Park, an NPR member radio station

References

External links
 

Mass media in the San Francisco Bay Area
Public television in the United States
Non-profit organizations based in the San Francisco Bay Area
Public radio in the United States